Garga-samhita (IAST: Garga-saṃhitā) is an ancient Sanskrit-language Vaishnavite scripture based on Hindu deities Radha and Krishna. Its authorship is attributed to the sage Garga, the head priest of Krishna's clan Yadava. It is the earliest text that associates Radha Krishna and gopis with the Holi festival.

Chapters 

Garga-Sanmita contains 11 khandas or parts:

See also 

 Brahma Samhita
 Brahma Vaivarta Purana

Notes

References

Further reading 

  Includes the original Sanskrit text with Roman transliteration and English translation.
 Garga Sanhita in Sanskrit and Hindi
 Garga Sanhita in English

Sanskrit literature
1st-century books
Krishna
Vaishnava texts